Love by Request is a 1983 Soviet comedy film directed by Sergey Mikaelyan. It was entered into the 33rd Berlin International Film Festival, where Yevgeniya Glushenko won the Silver Bear for Best Actress.

Plot
A handsome but poor former sportsman Igor Bragin and a plain but brainy librarian Vera Silkova make an unusual agreement: to fall in love with each other through will alone. In the background is late Soviet reality with a few of its unattractive features – ambition ridden careerists, black market, drunkenness, growing skepticism and disillusionment with ideals.

Cast
 Oleg Yankovskiy as Igor
 Yevgeniya Glushenko as Vera
 Vsevolod Shilovsky as Nikolai
 Irina Reznikova as Natasha
 Yuriy Dubrovin as Petrushin
 Vladimir Belousov as Gena
 Yuri Kopych as Mikhail Petrovich
 Kira Kreylis-Petrova as Vera's mother
 Ivan Ufimtsev as painter (voiced by Georgi Vitsin)
 Svetlana Shershneva as Vera's friend, an employee of the library
 Natalya Yegorova as resting
 Sergei Losev as planner
 Nikolai Drozdov (cameo)

References

External links

1983 films
1983 romantic comedy films
Soviet romantic comedy films
1980s Russian-language films
Films directed by Sergei Mikaelyan
Russian romantic comedy films